Bucky McMillan (born August 12, 1983) is an American basketball coach. He is currently the head coach at Samford.

Early life and education
McMillan played basketball at Mountain Brook High School in Alabama and led them to a state final four in 2001. He played for Birmingham Southern from 2002 to 2006. McMillan was named to the league All-Academic team as a senior, and he graduated from Birmingham-Southern in 2007 with a degree in education services.

Coaching career
While in college, McMillan coached youth teams in Mountain Brook, and became the junior varsity head coach in 2006. McMillan was hired as the head coach at Mountain Brook in 2008. In his first season, the team finished 18-12. He has won three 7A basketball championships, two 6A basketball championships for Mountain Brook. He coached the Spartans to two championship runner-ups, seven final four appearances, 10 regional appearances and nine area titles.

in 2018, McMillan was named the national Boys Basketball Coach of the Year by the National High School Coaches Association after the team finished 34-3. He's the first Alabama coach to win the national honor from the NHSCA. McMillan was named the coach of the 2019 Alabama-Mississippi All-Star Game. He was the USA Today's Alabama Coach of the Year in 2019. In 2020, Mountain Brook was ranked 13th in the top 25 public high school basketball programs in the United States over the past ten years. He finished 333-74 in twelve seasons at Mountain Brook, averaging nearly 28 wins per season.

On April 6, 2020, McMillan was hired as head coach at Samford, replacing Scott Padgett. His former coach at Birmingham Southern, Duane Reboul, came out of retirement to join McMillan's staff as a special assistant at Samford. McMillan drew attention for his uptempo and aggressive style of play, nicknamed "Bucky Ball", and his team posted a 96–83 upset at Belmont on December 5, 2020. In his first season, Samford finished 6-13 overall and 2-9 in the Southern Conference, and had eight games canceled due to COVID-19 precautions. In 2022, McMillan was named Southern Conference Coach of the Year by the media.

Head coaching record

References

External links
College stats at SportsReference.com

1983 births
Living people
American men's basketball coaches
American men's basketball players
Basketball coaches from Alabama
Basketball players from Birmingham, Alabama
Birmingham–Southern Panthers men's basketball players
High school basketball coaches in Alabama
Samford Bulldogs men's basketball coaches
Sportspeople from Birmingham, Alabama